Ikue (written: 育江, 育恵, 郁恵, 郁絵 or いくえ in hiragana) is a feminine Japanese given name. Notable people with the name include:

, Japanese singer
, Japanese curler
, Japanese musician
, Japanese actress and voice actress
, Japanese actress and singer
, Japanese speed skater

See also
International Union of Catholic Esperantists

Japanese feminine given names